TV Jones  is a U.S. guitar pickup manufacturer in Poulsbo, Washington. Best known for manufacturing vintage-style Filter' Tron pickups, TV Jones pickups attempt to recreate the sound of vintage Gretsch guitars by using American-made materials and a manufacturing process similar to what was used in the late 1950s and 1960s by Gretsch. The company was founded in 1993 by guitarist and luthier Thomas V. Jones in Whittier, California.

History
Prior to the focus on guitar pickups, TV Jones was mainly in the business of guitar repairs and custom guitar making. Jones had a long list of famous clients, from working several years at a repair shop in Long Beach, California called the World of Strings. Clients included Brian Setzer, Michael Anthony and others. After his stint at World of Strings, Jones opened his own shop and launched the TV Jones Company, where he continued to attract star clients like Joe Walsh and John Fogerty simply through word of mouth.

In the early 1990s, interest turned to electronics and Jones began to examine pickups and the magnets used in various vintage models. Around this time he was asked to repair a number of guitars for Stray Cats / BSO guitarist Brian Setzer, whose guitar sound relied heavily on vintage Gretsch guitars. When the Gretsch Guitar Company was in the process of creating a Brian Setzer signature model, Brian conducted a “blind sound test” of various pickup models that were to be considered for use in these guitars. Tom's Hotrod pickup design was chosen because of its sound being the most faithful to the original. (At this point, the pickups Gretsch was using in their guitars were made of overseas parts and ceramic magnets).

Notoriety
Word soon spread that TV Jones was making “true-to-the-original” Filter'Tron pickups and many famous players demanded their guitars be outfitted with TV Jones pickups. The guitarists (especially Gretsch aficionados) became aware of TV Jones pickups and its popularity grew as the company expanded its product line into the Magnetron, Power'Tron, Super’Tron and Thunder’Tron models. As of 2010, TV Jones offers eight different pickup models around the world.

Users
Jim Heath (TV Classics)
Brian Setzer (TV Classics)
Billy F. Gibbons (Power 'Tron Plus)
Billy Duffy - The Cult (TV Classic Plus)
G. Love & Special Sauce (Power 'Tron)
John Mayer (TV Classics in Fender La Cabronita Telecaster)
Chris Cheney (TV Classic Plus, Power 'Tron)
Johan Frandsen (TV Classics/TV Classic Plus/Power Tron)
Noel Gallagher (TV Classics)
David Gilmour (TV Classics)
Sean Christopher - Villains Of Yesterday (TV Power 'Tron Plus)

Guitar Models
In 2008 TV Jones released the Spectra Sonic Supreme Guitar (which is an upgrade to the Spectra Sonic designed by TV Jones and manufactured & distributed by Gretsch in 2001–2007) and the smaller, lighter, solid-body Model 10. Both are designed by TV Jones and manufactured in Japan at the Terada factory where the most professional line Gretsch guitars are made.

References

External links 

Guitar pickup manufacturers